Ambrosio de Funes Villalpando, count of Ricla (born in Zaragoza, Spain, in 1720; died in Madrid in 1782), was a captain general of Cuba, from 1763 to September 1766. Prior to that, he had represented Spain at the court of Russia.

After returning to Spain, he was appointed as Viceroy of Navarre, Capitan General of Catalonia and, lastly, served Carlos III as his Secretary of War.

Biography
Villalpando entered the Spanish Army, and in 1760 was appointed to represent Spain at the court of Russia. In July 1763, after Great Britain defeated France in the Seven Years' War, it also signed the Treaty of Paris with Spain, settling control of territories in North America. France ceded its territories east of the Mississippi River to Britain, and West Louisiana (and Caribbean islands) to Spain. The count of Ricla took possession of the island of Cuba in the name of the king of Spain as governor and captain general.

Villalpando served in this office until September 1766. During his short administration he improved defenses: repairing the fortifications of the city of Havana, and beginning construction of the great fortress known as La Cabaña. In addition, he improved government administration, organizing the department of finances, the police, the militia, and the hospitals. In 1764 he founded the newspaper La Gaceta de la Havana (Havana Gazette).

After his return in Spain, Villalpando was appointed as Viceroy of Navarra, and Capitain General of Catalonia. During the reign of Carlos III, Villalpando served in the cabinet as Secretary of War.

Villalpando died in Madrid on July 15, 1782, at age 62.

Honors
One of the most important streets in Havana is named Calle de Ricla in his honor.

Notes

References

External links
  

1720 births
1780 deaths
Counts of Spain
Spanish diplomats
People from Zaragoza
Governors of Cuba
Spanish colonial period of Cuba
Viceroys of Navarre